Wang Zhihui (born 1 May 1965) is a retired Chinese long jumper.

She won the 1987 Asian Championships in a new championship record of 6.70 metres. This was also her career best jump.

She also competed at the 1987 World Championships without reaching the final round.

References

1965 births
Living people
Chinese female long jumpers
20th-century Chinese women